Saliceto  may refer to:

William of Saliceto also known as Guilielmus de Saliceto

Places
France
 Saliceto, Haute-Corse, a commune in Corsica

Italy
 Saliceto, Piedmont, a comune in the Province of Cuneo